The Cal State Northridge Matadors football team represented California State University, Northridge in the sport of American football from the 1962 through 2001 seasons. Between 1962 through 1992, Cal State Northridge competed at the NCAA Division II level prior to moving to Division I-AA in 1993. The Matadors played their home games at multiple stadiums throughout their history with the most recent being North Campus Stadium in Northridge, California.

Until 1972, the school's name was "San Fernando Valley State College." The team disbanded after 2001 due to budget concerns, with the cost of the program ($1.3 million per year) outweighing a department that was thousands of dollars in the red. The scholarships were honored by the school.

Yearly records

Conference championships
The Matadors won three conference championships in their time playing college football.

† denotes shared championship.

Playoff appearances

NCAA Division II playoffs
The Matadors made one appearance in the Division II playoffs, with a combined record of 0-1.

Notable players
 Sherdrick Bonner
 Joe Rice
 Eric Treibatch
 Lon Boyett
 Daved Benefield
 Marcus Brady
 D. J. Hackett
 Doug Jones
 Chris Parker
 Alo Sila
 Bryan Wagner
 Keith Watkins
 Bruce Lemmerman
 Melvin Wilson
 Andrew Amerson
 Derek Sage
 Pat Cerruti
 Kip Dukes
 Mario Hull

References

 
1962 establishments in California
2001 disestablishments in California
American football teams established in 1962
American football teams disestablished in 2001